Al-Jahra SC, also written as Al Jahraa, is a Kuwaiti professional basketball team based in Jahra City. It is the basketball team of the multi-sports club with the same name. The team plays in the Kuwaiti Division 1, and has won the league in 1996 and 1997.

Notable players

 Salah Mejri
 Wael Arakji
 Kalin Lucas

References

Basketball teams in Kuwait